A Day in Black and White may refer to:

 A Day in Black and White (band), American band
 A Day in Black and White (film), American film